Viss is a village in Borsod-Abaúj-Zemplén county, Hungary. Lajos Nemirunk, notable for being the last person publicly executed in Hungary, was born here.

External links 
 Street map 

Populated places in Borsod-Abaúj-Zemplén County